Dunwell, now a ghost town, was a community in Hooker County, Nebraska, United States. A post office was operated in Dunwell for over thirty years, opening on 27 January 1900 and closing in 1934. The community's elevation and geographic coordinates are unknown, although a 1914 map reveals that it lay midway between Mullen and Tryon.

References

Populated places in Hooker County, Nebraska
Ghost towns in Nebraska